Kunchanapalli is a village in Guntur district of the Indian state of Andhra Pradesh. It is located in Tadepalle mandal part of Mangalagiri Tadepalle Municipal Corporation part of Guntur revenue division.

Geography 
It has an average elevation of 5 meters (19 feet).

Government and politics 
Kunchanapalli gram panchayat is the local self-government of the village. It is divided into wards and each ward is represented by a ward member. The ward members are headed by a Sarpanch. The village forms a part of Andhra Pradesh Capital Region and is under the jurisdiction of APCRDA.

See also 
List of villages in Guntur district

References 

Villages in Guntur district